The American League West is one of Major League Baseball's six divisions. The division has five teams as of the 2013 season, but had four teams from 1994 to 2012, and had as many as seven teams before the 1994 realignment. Although its teams currently only reside along the west coast and in Texas, historically the division has had teams as far east as Chicago. From 1998 (when the NL West expanded to five teams) to 2012, the AL West was the only MLB division with four teams. The current champion of this division is the Houston Astros. In 2013, the Houston Astros went from the National League Central to the AL West. That move gives all six MLB divisions an equal five teams and both leagues an equal 15 teams each.

Division membership

Current members
 Houston Astros - Joined in 2013; formerly from the NL West (1969–1993) and NL Central (1994–2012) 
 Los Angeles Angels – Founding member (as the California Angels) 
 Oakland Athletics – Founding member
 Seattle Mariners – Joined in 1977 as an expansion team
 Texas Rangers – Joined in 1972; formerly of the AL East (as the 1961–1971 Washington Senators)

Former members
 Chicago White Sox – Founding member; moved to the AL Central in 1994
 Kansas City Royals – Founding member; moved to the AL Central in 1994
 Minnesota Twins – Founding member; moved to the AL Central in 1994
 Milwaukee Brewers – Founding member (as Seattle Pilots); moved to the AL East in 1972, then to the AL Central in 1994. Eventually moved to the NL Central in 1998.

Division members
 Place cursor over year for division champion or World Series team.
 

 Creation of division due to 1969 expansion, Kansas City and Seattle added.
 Seattle franchise moved to Milwaukee, becoming the Brewers.
 Washington Senators moved to Dallas–Fort Worth, became Texas Rangers and switched divisions with Milwaukee, which moved to the AL East.
 Seattle added in the 1977 league expansion.
 Chicago, Kansas City, and Minnesota moved into the newly created AL Central due to the 1994 realignment.
 In 1997, California Angels become Anaheim Angels. In 2005, Anaheim Angels become Los Angeles Angels of Anaheim. In 2016, Los Angeles Angels of Anaheim become Los Angeles Angels.
 Houston switches leagues from the NL Central.

Champions by year
 Team names link to the season in which each team played

† – Due to the players' strike, the season was split in two. The Athletics won the first half and defeated the second-half winner, the Kansas City Royals (50 – 53 overall record) to win the division.
§ – Due to the 1994–95 Major League Baseball strike, starting on August 12, no official winner was declared. The Texas Rangers were leading in winning percentage at time of the strike.
* – Seattle defeated the California Angels in a one-game playoff for the division title, 9 – 1.
†† – Due to the COVID-19 pandemic, the season was shortened to 60 games. By virtue of the eight-team postseason format used for that season, division runner-up Houston (29–31, .483) also qualified for the playoffs.

Other postseason teams
See List of American League Wild Card winners (since 1994)

* – From 2012 to 2019, and in 2021, the Wild Card was expanded to two teams. Those teams faced each other in the Wild Card Game to determine the final participant in the American League Division Series. In 2020 only, eight teams, including the three division winners, played in a best-of-three Wild Card Series, with the winners advancing to the Division Series. Starting in 2022, the Wild Card field was increased to three teams, and along with the lowest-ranked division winner, qualified for the Wild Card Series to determine the remaining two slots in the Division Series.

Season results

Notes and Tiebreakers
 Seattle and California were tied for the division championship and played in a tie-breaker game. The Mariners won 9–1 to claim the division crown.
 Anaheim and Minnesota of the American League Central were tied for the second and third seed, but the Angels claimed the second seed by winning the season series 5–4.
 Los Angeles and New York Yankees of the American League East were tied for the second and third seed, but the Angels claimed the second seed by winning the season series 6–4.
 Texas and Tampa Bay of the American League East were tied for the second wild-card berth and played in a tie-breaker game. The Rangers lost 5–2 and were eliminated from postseason contention.

AL West statistics

See also
 American League East
 American League Central
 National League East
 National League Central
 National League West

References

External links 
 MLB final standings by year

1969 establishments in the United States
Major League Baseball divisions
Sports in the Western United States